KRVH is a non-commercial educational, Classic rock and Sports Radio formatted FM broadcasting radio station licensed to the River Delta Unified School District in Rio Vista, California, serving the Sacramento River Delta region of Northern California.

References

External links
 
 KRVH Tuned In To The Community
 

RVH
High school radio stations in the United States
Radio stations established in 1973
1973 establishments in California